Tars and Spars is a 1946 American musical romantic comedy film directed by Alfred E. Green and starring Alfred Drake, Janet Blair, and Marc Platt.

Plot
Howard Young is a coast guardsman who has been on shore duty for three years despite his efforts to be sent into action. His nearest approach to sea duty was on a harbor-moored life raft for 21 days as part of an experiment with a new type of vitamin gum for the government. He meets Christine Bradley, a SPAR, sent to take over his communications job and, by things he leaves unsaid, she thinks his life-raft experience was the result of a ship-wreck at sea.

Cast list
 Alfred Drake as Howard Young of Oklahoma 
 Janet Blair as Christine Bradley of Pennsylvania 
 Marc Platt as Junior Casady of Indiana 
 Jeff Donnell as Penny McDougal of Brooklyn 
 Sid Caesar as Chuck Enders of Yonkers, U.S.A. 
 Ray Walker as Lieutenant Scully
 James Flavin as Chief Bosun Mate Gurney

References

External links
 
 
 

Columbia Pictures films
Films directed by Alfred E. Green
1946 romantic comedy films
1946 films
American musical comedy films
American romantic comedy films
American black-and-white films
Films about the United States Coast Guard
1940s American films